Doris fretterae is a species of sea slug, a dorid nudibranch, a marine gastropod mollusc in the family Dorididae.

Distribution
This species was described from Jamaica.

References

Dorididae
Gastropods described in 1980